The Shadow Riders may refer to:
 Shadow Riders, a fictional villain group in the Yu-Gi-Oh! GX series
 The Shadow Riders, a 1982 novel by Louis L'Amour
 The Shadow Riders (film), a 1982 TV film starring Tom Selleck and Sam Elliott